In 3D computer graphics, 3D modeling is the process of developing a mathematical coordinate-based representation of any surface of an object (inanimate or living) in three dimensions via specialized software by manipulating edges, vertices, and polygons in a simulated 3D space.

Three-dimensional (3D) models represent a physical body using a collection of points in 3D space, connected by various geometric entities such as triangles, lines, curved surfaces, etc. Being a collection of data (points and other information), 3D models can be created manually, algorithmically (procedural modeling), or by scanning. Their surfaces may be further defined with texture mapping.

Outline 

The product is called a 3D model. Someone who works with 3D models may be referred to as a 3D artist or a 3D modeler.

A 3D Model can also be displayed as a two-dimensional image through a process called 3D rendering or used in a computer simulation of physical phenomena.

3D Models may be created automatically or manually. The manual modeling process of preparing geometric data for 3D computer graphics is similar to plastic arts such as sculpting. The 3D model can be physically created using 3D printing devices that form 2D layers of the model with three-dimensional material, one layer at a time. Without a 3D model, a 3D print is not possible.

3D modeling software is a class of 3D computer graphics software used to produce 3D models. Individual programs of this class, such as SketchUp, are called modeling applications.

History 

3D models are now widely used anywhere in 3D graphics and CAD but their history predates the widespread use of 3D graphics on personal computers.

In the past, many computer games used pre-rendered images of 3D models as sprites before computers could render them in real-time. The designer can then see the model in various directions and views, this can help the designer see if the object is created as intended to compared to their original vision. Seeing the design this way can help the designer or company figure out changes or improvements needed to the product.

Representation

Almost all 3D models can be divided into two categories:
 Solid – These models define the volume of the object they represent (like a rock).  Solid models are mostly used for engineering and medical simulations, and are usually built with constructive solid geometry
 Shell or boundary – These models represent the surface, i.e. the boundary of the object, not its volume (like an infinitesimally thin eggshell).  Almost all visual models used in games and film are shell models.

Solid and shell modeling can create functionally identical objects.  Differences between them are mostly variations in the way they are created and edited and conventions of use in various fields and differences in types of approximations between the model and reality.

Shell models must be manifold (having no holes or cracks in the shell) to be meaningful as a real object. In a shell model of a cube, the bottom and top surface of the cube must have a uniform thickness with no holes or cracks in the first and last layer printed.  Polygonal meshes (and to a lesser extent subdivision surfaces) are by far the most common representation. Level sets are a useful representation for deforming surfaces which undergo many topological changes such as fluids.

The process of transforming representations of objects, such as the middle point coordinate of a sphere and a point on its circumference into a polygon representation of a sphere, is called tessellation. This step is used in polygon-based rendering, where objects are broken down from abstract representations ("primitives") such as spheres, cones etc., to so-called meshes, which are nets of interconnected triangles. Meshes of triangles (instead of e.g. squares) are popular as they have proven to be easy to rasterize (the surface described by each triangle is planar, so the projection is always convex); . Polygon representations are not used in all rendering techniques, and in these cases the tessellation step is not included in the transition from abstract representation to rendered scene.

Process
There are three popular ways to represent a model:
 Polygonal modeling – Points in 3D space, called vertices, are connected by line segments to form a polygon mesh. The vast majority of 3D models today are built as textured polygonal models, because they are flexible, because computers can render them so quickly. However, polygons are planar and can only approximate curved surfaces using many polygons.
 Curve modeling – Surfaces are defined by curves, which are influenced by weighted control points. The curve follows (but does not necessarily interpolate) the points. Increasing the weight for a point will pull the curve closer to that point. Curve types include nonuniform rational B-spline (NURBS), splines, patches, and geometric primitives
 Digital sculpting – Still a fairly new method of modeling, 3D sculpting has become very popular in the few years it has been around. There are currently three types of digital sculpting: Displacement,  which is the most widely used among applications at this moment, uses a dense model (often generated by subdivision surfaces of a polygon control mesh) and stores new locations for the vertex positions through use of an image map that stores the adjusted locations. Volumetric, loosely based on voxels, has similar capabilities as displacement but does not suffer from polygon stretching when there are not enough polygons in a region to achieve a deformation. Dynamic tessellation, which is similar to voxel, divides the surface using triangulation to maintain a smooth surface and allow finer details. These methods allow for very artistic exploration as the model will have a new topology created over it once the models form and possibly details have been sculpted. The new mesh will usually have the original high resolution mesh information transferred into displacement data or normal map data if for a game engine.

The modeling stage consists of shaping individual objects that are later used in the scene. There are a number of modeling techniques, including:
 Constructive solid geometry
 Implicit surfaces
 Subdivision surfaces

Modeling can be performed by means of a dedicated program (e.g., Blender, Cinema 4D, LightWave, Maya, Modo, 3ds Max) or an application component (Shaper, Lofter in 3ds Max) or some scene description language (as in POV-Ray). In some cases, there is no strict distinction between these phases; in such cases modeling is just part of the scene creation process (this is the case, for example, with Caligari trueSpace and Realsoft 3D).

3D models can also be created using the technique of Photogrammetry with dedicated programs such as RealityCapture, Metashape and 3DF Zephyr. Cleanup and further processing can be performed with applications such as MeshLab, the GigaMesh Software Framework, netfabb or MeshMixer. Photogrammetry creates models using algorithms to interpret the shape and texture of real-world objects and environments based on photographs taken from many angles of the subject.

Complex materials such as blowing sand, clouds, and liquid sprays are modeled with particle systems, and are a mass of 3D coordinates which have either points, polygons, texture splats, or sprites assigned to them.

Human models

The first widely available commercial application of human virtual models appeared in 1998 on the Lands' End web site. The human virtual models were created by the company My Virtual Mode Inc. and enabled users to create a model of themselves and try on 3D clothing. There are several modern programs that allow for the creation of virtual human models (Poser being one example).

3D clothing

The development of cloth simulation software such as Marvelous Designer, CLO3D and Optitex, has enabled artists and fashion designers to model dynamic 3D clothing on the computer.
Dynamic 3D clothing is used for virtual fashion catalogs, as well as for dressing 3D characters for video games, 3D animation movies, for digital doubles in movies as well as for making clothes for avatars in virtual worlds such as SecondLife.

Comparison with 2D methods
3D photorealistic effects are often achieved without wire-frame modeling and are sometimes indistinguishable in the final form. Some graphic art software includes filters that can be applied to 2D vector graphics or 2D raster graphics on transparent layers.

Advantages of wireframe 3D modeling over exclusively 2D methods include:
 Flexibility, ability to change angles or animate images with quicker rendering of the changes;
 Ease of rendering, automatic calculation and rendering photorealistic effects rather than mentally visualizing or estimating;
 Accurate photorealism, less chance of human error in misplacing, overdoing, or forgetting to include a visual effect.

Disadvantages compare to 2D photorealistic rendering may include a software learning curve and difficulty achieving certain photorealistic effects. Some photorealistic effects may be achieved with special rendering filters included in the 3D modeling software. For the best of both worlds, some artists use a combination of 3D modeling followed by editing the 2D computer-rendered images from the 3D model.

3D model market
A large market for 3D models (as well as 3D-related content, such as textures, scripts, etc.) still exists – either for individual models or large collections. Several online marketplaces for 3D content allow individual artists to sell content that they have created, including TurboSquid, CGStudio, CreativeMarket, MyMiniFactory, Sketchfab, CGTrader and Cults. Often, the artists' goal is to get additional value out of assets they have previously created for projects. By doing so, artists can earn more money out of their old content, and companies can save money by buying pre-made models instead of paying an employee to create one from scratch. These marketplaces typically split the sale between themselves and the artist that created the asset, artists get 40% to 95% of the sales according to the marketplace. In most cases, the artist retains ownership of the 3d model while the customer only buys the right to use and present the model. Some artists sell their products directly in its own stores offering their products at a lower price by not using intermediaries.

The architecture, engineering, and construction (AEC) industry is the biggest market for 3D modeling, with an estimated value of $12.13 billion by 2028. This is due to the increasing adoption of 3D modeling in the AEC industry, which helps to improve design accuracy, reduce errors and omissions, and facilitate collaboration among project stakeholders.

Over the last several years numerous marketplaces specializing in 3D rendering and printing models have emerged. Some of the 3D printing marketplaces are a combination of models sharing sites, with or without a built in e-com capability. Some of those platforms also offer 3D printing services on demand, software for model rendering and dynamic viewing of items. 3D printing file sharing and model rendering platforms include Shapeways, Sketchfab, Pinshape, Thingiverse, TurboSquid, CGTrader, Threeding, MyMiniFactory, and GrabCAD.

3D printing

The term 3D printing or three-dimensional printing is a form of additive manufacturing technology where a three-dimensional object is created from successive layers material. Objects can be created without the need for complex expensive molds or assembly with multiple parts. 3D printing allows ideas to be prototyped and tested without having to go through a production process.

In recent years, there has been an upsurge in the number of companies offering personalized 3D printed models of objects that have been scanned, designed in CAD software, and then printed to the customer's requirements. 3D models can be purchased from online marketplaces and printed by individuals or companies using commercially available 3D printers, enabling the home-production of objects such as spare parts and even medical equipment—.

Uses

Today, 3D modeling is used in various industries like film, animation and gaming, interior design and architecture. They are also used in the medical industry to create interactive representations of anatomy.

The medical industry uses detailed models of organs; these may be created with multiple 2-D image slices from an MRI or CT scan. The movie industry uses them as characters and objects for animated and real-life motion pictures. The video game industry uses them as assets for computer and video games.

The science sector uses them as highly detailed models of chemical compounds.

The architecture industry uses them to demonstrate proposed buildings and landscapes in lieu of traditional, physical architectural models. Additionally, the use of Level of Detail (LOD) in 3D models is becoming increasingly important in the AEC industry. LOD is a measure of the level of detail and accuracy included in a 3D model. The LOD levels range from 100 to 500, with LOD 100 representing a conceptual model that shows the basic massing and location of objects, and LOD 500 representing an extremely detailed model that includes information about every aspect of the building, including MEP systems and interior finishes. By using LOD, architects, engineers, and General contractor can more effectively communicate design intent and make more informed decisions throughout the construction process.

The archaeology community is now creating 3D models of cultural heritage for research and visualization.

The engineering community utilizes them as designs of new devices, vehicles and structures as well as a host of other uses.

In recent decades the earth science community has started to construct 3D geological models as a standard practice.

3D models can also be the basis for physical devices that are built with 3D printers or CNC machines.

In terms of video game development, 3D modeling is one stage in a longer development process.  Simply put, the source of the geometry for the shape of an object can be:
 A designer, industrial engineer or artist using a 3D-CAD system
 An existing object, reverse engineered or copied using a 3-D shape digitizer or scanner
 Mathematical data stored in memory based on a numerical description or calculation of the object.

A wide number of 3D software are also used in constructing digital representation of mechanical models or parts before they are actually manufactured. CAD- and CAM-related software is used in such fields, and with this software, not only can you construct the parts, but also assemble them, and observe their functionality.

3D modeling is also used in the field of industrial design, wherein products are 3D modeled before representing them to the clients. In media and event industries, 3D modeling is used in stage and set design.

The OWL 2 translation of the vocabulary of X3D can be used to provide semantic descriptions for 3D models, which is suitable for indexing and retrieval of 3D models by features such as geometry, dimensions, material, texture, diffuse reflection, transmission spectra, transparency, reflectivity, opalescence, glazes, varnishes, and enamels (as opposed to unstructured textual descriptions or 2.5D virtual museums and exhibitions using Google Street View on Google Arts & Culture, for example). The RDF representation of 3D models can be used in reasoning, which enables intelligent 3D applications which, for example, can automatically compare two 3D models by volume.

Testing a 3D solid model 

3D solid models can be tested in different ways depending on what is needed by using simulation, mechanism design, and analysis. If a motor is designed and assembled correctly (this can be done differently depending on what 3D modeling program is being used), using the mechanism tool the user should be able to tell if the motor or machine is assembled correctly by how it operates. Different design will need to be tested in different ways. For example; a pool pump would need a simulation ran of the water running through the pump to see how the water flows through the pump. These tests verify if a product is developed correctly or if it needs to be modified to meet its requirements.

See also

 List of 3D modeling software
 List of common 3D test models
 List of file formats#3D graphics
 3D city model
 3D computer graphics software
 3D figure
 3D printing
 3D scanner
 3D scanning
 Additive manufacturing file format
 Building information modeling
 Cloth modeling
 Computer facial animation
 Cornell box
 Digital geometry
 Edge loop
 Geological modeling
 Holography
 Industrial CT scanning
 Marching cubes
 Open CASCADE
 Polygon mesh
 Polygonal modeling
 Ray tracing (graphics)
 Scaling (geometry)
 SIGGRAPH
 Stanford bunny
 Triangle mesh
 Utah teapot
 Voxel
 B-rep

References

External links

3D computer graphics
3D imaging
Visual effects
Video game design
Computer-aided engineering

ja:3Dモデリング